Ardisia dukei is a species of plant in the family Primulaceae. It is endemic to Panama. It is also listed as endangered by the IUCN.

References

Endemic flora of Panama
dukei
Endangered plants
Taxonomy articles created by Polbot